Haukur Sigurðsson (born 26 March 1956) is an Icelandic cross-country skier. He competed in the men's 15 kilometre event at the 1980 Winter Olympics.

References

1956 births
Living people
Haukur Sigurdsson
Haukur Sigurdsson
Cross-country skiers at the 1980 Winter Olympics
Place of birth missing (living people)
20th-century Icelandic people